Richard Lewknor (c. 1589 – 27 May 1635) was an English politician who sat in the House of Commons between 1621 and 1629.

Lewknor was the son of Richard Lewknor, of West Dean, Sussex, and Eleanor, daughter of Sir Christopher Brome of Holton, Oxfordshire. He was the elder brother of Christopher Lewknor, also an MP. He came into possession of the family manor of West Dean on the death of his grandfather Sir Richard Lewknor in 1616. 

In 1621, Lewknor was elected Member of Parliament for Midhurst. He was re-elected in 1624 1625 and 1626. In 1628 he was elected MP for  Sussex. 
 
Lewknor died at the age of  46.

References

 

1580s births
1635 deaths
People from West Dean, West Sussex
People from Midhurst
English MPs 1621–1622
English MPs 1624–1625
English MPs 1625
English MPs 1626
English MPs 1628–1629